"Doctor Worm" is a song by They Might Be Giants. It first appeared on the primarily live album Severe Tire Damage, being one of only three studio-recorded songs on the album. It was also released as a single and featured in a music video directed by band member John Flansburgh.

Details
The lyrics describe a worm learning to play the drums better. They invent a stage name for themself ("Doctor Worm"), and the song's narrator also describes their friend, a bass-playing vole known as "Rabbi Vole".

Discussing the lyrical inspiration, Flansburgh said, "For a long, long time we have been riffing on the song 'Dr. Love' by the band Kiss. And I think just the weirdness of the conceit of that song was kind of rolling around in John Linnell's head. I know a million, billion times we've talked about the song 'Dr. Love'. It's such an absurd song. So I think 'Dr. Love' was kind of the springboard for the idea behind 'Dr. Worm'."

The song placed as #13 on the Triple J Hottest 100, 1998 and appears on the compilation CD.

Music video
The music video directed by John Flansburgh, shot in black and white, features the band performing the song in an apartment office surrounded by medical paraphernalia.

An alternate music video for the song directed by the cartoonist Kaz was featured in an episode of the Nickelodeon television series KaBlam!. In the video, Doctor Worm (an actual worm in medical attire) earns the respect of a musical group in search of a percussionist.

Cover versions
In 2006, Jason Trachtenburg of Trachtenburg Family Slideshow Players covered the song for the They Might Be Giants tribute album, Hello Radio.
In 2011, Relient K covered the song for their cover album, Is for Karaoke. In the cover, the band altered the lyrics "Rabbi Vole" to "Rabbi Warne", as a reference to John Warne, Relient K's bassist.

References

External links
Doctor Worm at This Might Be A Wiki

1998 songs
Fictional rock musicians
Fictional worms
Songs about drums
Songs about fictional male characters
Songs about invertebrates
Songs about mammals
Songs about musicians
Songs about physicians
Songs written by John Flansburgh
Songs written by John Linnell
They Might Be Giants songs